Eve is the fourth studio album by British rock band The Alan Parsons Project, released on 27 August 1979 by Arista Records. The album's focus is on the strength and characteristics of women, and the problems they face in the world of men. It had originally been intended to focus on "great women in history", but evolved into a wider concept. The album name was the same as Eric Woolfson's mother in law.

Eve is The Alan Parsons Project's first album with singer Chris Rainbow. The album's opening instrumental "Lucifer" was a major hit in Europe, and "Damned If I Do" reached the US Top 40, peaking at No. 27, and reaching No. 16 in Canada. "Lucifer" also is used as title track for the German political TV show Monitor.

Track listing
All songs written and composed by Alan Parsons and Eric Woolfson.

Eve was remastered and reissued in 2008 with the following bonus tracks:
<LI>"Elsie's Theme from 'The Sicilian Defence' (the Project that never was)"
<LI>"Lucifer" (demo)
<LI>"Secret Garden" (early rough mix)
<LI>"Damned If I Do" (rough mix)
<LI>"Don't Hold Back" (vocal rehearsal rough mix)
<LI>"Lucifer" (early rough mix)
<LI>"If I Could Change Your Mind" (rough mix)

Personnel 
 Andrew Powell – orchestral arrangements, choral arrangements, conductor
 David Paton – bass, lead and backing vocals
 Stuart Elliott – drums, percussion
 Ian Bairnson – electric and acoustic guitars
 Eric Woolfson – keyboards, executive producer
 Duncan Mackay – keyboards
 Alan Parsons – production, engineering, Morse code (E . V ..._ E .) on "Lucifer"
 Chris Rainbow – lead and backing vocals
 Lesley Duncan – lead vocal
 Clare Torry – lead vocal
 Dave Townsend – lead vocal
 Lenny Zakatek – lead vocal
 The Orchestra of the Munich Chamber Opera care of Eberhard Schoener
 Sandor Farkas – leader
 Curtis Briggs – coordinator
 Shapiro and Steinberg – trivia consultants
 Hipgnosis – cover art

Two of the lead singers on the album, Clare Torry and Lesley Duncan, previously performed on Alan Parsons' signature engineering work, Pink Floyd's The Dark Side of the Moon.

Cover art
The gatefold cover art for Eve by Hipgnosis features three women wearing veils (two on the front, one on the reverse), with their faces partially in shadow. The shadows and veils partially conceal disfiguring scars and sores (the lesions were not real, however). Controversy over the disfiguring of the models' faces brought comment from Eric Woolfson, "The cover seemed a mis-match to me. It was a brilliant cover from Hipgnosis, but it didn't reflect my thinking at all, or relate to what is made clear on the Record."

Bonus tracks detail
 Elsie's theme from "The Sicilian Defence" (The project that never was) - Was from an experimental album entitled "The Sicilian Defence". Recorded at the same time as Eve, the album was not released at the time.
 Lucifer (Demo) - Was recorded in a beachfront apartment in Monaco.

Charts

Weekly charts

Year-end charts

Certifications

References

External links
http://www.the-alan-parsons-project.com/eve

The Alan Parsons Project albums
Concept albums
1979 albums
Albums with cover art by Hipgnosis
Albums produced by Alan Parsons
Arista Records albums